The 35th anniversary of the founding of the People's Republic of China took place on 1 October 1984. A military parade was held in Tiananmen Square in Beijing and various celebrations were conducted all over the country. China's paramount leader Deng Xiaoping inspected the troops along Chang'an Avenue in Beijing. This parade was immediately followed by a civilian parade.

Parade
In December 1983, the Central Committee of the Chinese Communist Party convened to approve a motion to hold a military parade on National Day the following October. It was the first one to be held in 25 years since the celebration of the 10th anniversary of the People's Republic of China in 1959. A parade for the 30th anniversary in 1979 was planned but was soon scrapped in light of the end of the Cultural Revolution and the death of Mao Zedong. On 12 December, the working group for the military parade was set up, with Yang Dezhi, PLA Chief of General Staff as the head. The parade was the first to be aired live on China Central Television and broadcast around the world via satellite. The parade was commanded by General Qin Jiwei in his position as Commander of the Beijing Military Region. It marked the first time that someone other than the Minister of National Defense had inspected a National Day parade and the only time that a Paramount leader who wasn't in a state or party position had inspected the parade. During the inspection, in which The People's Navy Marches Forward was the background music, the traditional greetings of Long Live the Communist Party of China and response of Long Live the People's Republic of China were replaced with Comrades you have worked hard! to which the troops respond with Serve the people!, in an effort to differentiate with Maoist parades.

It also marked the debut appearance of the regular honor guard companies and the color guard of the Beijing Garrison Honor Guard Battalion, which are the first to be inspected and march past dignitaries. The parade saw just over 10,300 troops march through the square, which was followed by 42 mobile formations and 4 flypasts. A group of Peking University students raised a banner made out of bedsheets that read "Hello Xiaoping", to which a surprised Deng responded with a smile and wave. In an interview with The People's Daily two days later, Defence Minister Zhang Aiping was quoted as saying "The people of the whole country and all the men and officers of the Army saw with their own eyes that the troop were much better equipped", referring to the military technology and armaments that were showcased. as it was the first to showcase Chinese made equipment.

Leaders in attendance
Hu Yaobang (General Secretary of the CCP)
Deng Xiaoping (CMC chairman and Advisory chairman)
Zhao Ziyang (Premier, official master of ceremonies)
Li Xiannian (President of the PRC)
Chen Yun, First Secretary of the Central Commission for Discipline Inspection
 Other CCP Politburo members
Deng Yingchao (widow of Zhou Enlai)
Li Ximing (Party Committee Secretary of Beijing)
Peng Zhen, Chairman of the Standing Committee of the National People's Congress
Deng Yingchao, Chairwoman of the National Committee of the Chinese People's Political Consultative Conference
Ulanhu, Vice President of the PRC
Xu Xiangqian, the 4th Minister of National Defense
Nie Rongzhen, the first and only Commander-in-Chief of the PLA
Prince Norodom Sihanouk
Son Sann, 22nd Prime Minister of Cambodia
Khieu Samphan, Chairman of the State Presidium of Democratic Kampuchea
Hoàng Văn Hoan, former Vietnamese Ambassador

References

Notes

External links
1984 China Military Parade Full Version | 1984年中国人民解放军大阅兵
1984 北京35週年國慶閱兵、羣衆遊行 （粵語旁述完整版

1980s in Beijing
1984 in China
1984 in military history
Anniversaries
Events in Beijing
Military history of the People's Republic of China
Military parades in China
October 1984 events in Asia